Armindo Araújo (born 1 September 1977) is a Portuguese rally driver. He won the Production World Rally Championship in the 2009 season, repeating the accomplishment in the next year (2010 season), to become the first pilot to ever win this cup twice in a row since its creation back in 2002.

Career

Araújo began rallying in 2000, having raced motorcycles since 1994. Between 2000 and 2004 he used a Citroën Saxo on Portuguese national events, winning the National Championship in 2003 and 2004, before winning the title again in 2005 and 2006 using a Group N Mitsubishi Lancer Evolution VIII.

In 2007 he began competing in the Production World Rally Championship (P-WRC), finishing 14th in the standings. In 2008 he finished eighth in the P-WRC standings. In 2009 he won the P-WRC class on Rally de Portugal, and two other podium finishes led to him winning the P-WRC.
Araujo was co-driven by Miguel Ramalho in all events across 2001-2008.

Araujo returned to rallying in 2018, competing in the Portuguese championship. He has won the championship in his returning season of 2018, driving a Hyundai i20 R5 prepared by Hyundai Team Portugal. He switched to a Škoda Fabia Rally2 evo, prepared by The Racing Factory, in 2020 to grab another title that year. As of right now, Araujo leads the 2022 European Rally Championship as the first 2 rounds took place in Portugal. 
Since his return, Araujo is co-driven by Luis Ramalho - brother of his former co-driver.

WRC results

PWRC results

WRC-2 results

References

External links 

 

1977 births
Portuguese rally drivers
Living people
World Rally Championship drivers
European Rally Championship drivers